Ketbi and Al Ketbi are Arab surnames:

 Fatima bint Mubarak Al Ketbi, one of the wives of the UAE's  founder
 Si Mohamed Ketbi (born 1997), Belgian taekwondo athlete
 Salem Al Ketbi, Emirati political analyst, researcher, and opinion writer